Alistair Wilson (born 20 August 1939) is a British sprint canoeist who competed in the mid-1960s. Competing in two Summer Olympics, he earned his best finish of eighth in the K-1 1000 m event at Tokyo in 1964.

References
Sports-reference.com profile

1939 births
Canoeists at the 1964 Summer Olympics
Canoeists at the 1968 Summer Olympics
Living people
Olympic canoeists of Great Britain
British male canoeists